Strange Free World is the second album by British alternative rock band Kitchens of Distinction, released on 19 February 1991 in the US by A&M Records and on 18 March 1991 in the UK by One Little Indian Records. It is the follow-up to their 1989 debut Love Is Hell. Noted producer Hugh Jones, who worked with Echo & the Bunnymen (on their 1981 album Heaven Up Here), among many others, helped KOD to sound more at ease in the studio.

Reviewer Ned Raggett of AllMusic notes that "Musically, the tunes sound quite ambitious in many ways, often steering away from conventional verse-chorus-verse formulas," and calling the album an overall excellent effort. It is often considered one of the group's best works, as well as possibly its most popular and commercially successful, peaking at number 45 on the UK Albums Chart. The album also includes their first UK charting single "Drive That Fast," which peaked at number 93 on the UK Singles Chart.

Track listing

Singles
"Quick as Rainbows" (March 1990)
 UK single:
 "Quick as Rainbows"
 "Mainly Mornings" (Live)
 "In a Cave" (Live)
 "Shiver" (Live)
 US promo 12" single:
 "Quick as Rainbows"
 "These Drinkers"
 "Elephantiny" [acoustic version of "Elephantine"]
 "Three to Beam Up"
"Drive That Fast" (January 1991)
 UK single:
 "Drive That Fast" (7" Edit)
 "These Drinkers"
 "Elephantiny"
 "Three to Beam Up"
 US promo 12" single:
 "Drive That Fast"
 "Railwayed"

Personnel
Kitchens of Distinction 
 Patrick Fitzgerald – vocals, bass
 Julian Swales – guitar
 Dan Goodwin – drums
with:
 Roddy Lorimer – trumpet on "Under the Sky, Inside the Sea"
Technical
 Hugh Jones – producer, engineer
 Michael Ade – assistant engineer
 Helen Woodward – mixing engineer
 Richard Norris – assistant mixing engineer
 Ken Perry – mastering
 Colin Bell – photography
 Art direction and design by Two Guys and Kitchens of Distinction
 Mixed at Master Rock
 Mastered at A&M Mastering

References

Kitchens of Distinction albums
1990 albums
Albums produced by Hugh Jones (producer)
One Little Independent Records albums